Belgium competed at the 1908 Summer Olympics in London, England.
It was the second appearance of the European nation, which had previously competed at the 1900 Summer Olympics.

Medalists

Results by event

Athletics

Cycling

Belgium's best cycling result was a bronze medal won in the 20 kilometres

Diving

Fencing

Gymnastics

Rowing

Sailing

Shooting

Swimming

Water polo

Wrestling

Notes

Sources
 
 

Nations at the 1908 Summer Olympics
1908
Olympics